The Kyoli or Cori (Chori) language is a Plateau language spoken in Southern Kaduna State, Nigeria.

Overview
It is spoken in the northeast of Nok in Jaba Local Government Area (LGA), Kaduna State. The speakers prefer to spell the name of their language as Kyoli, which is pronounced  [kjoli] or [çjoli]. The ethnic group is referred to as Kwoli.

There are about 7,000-8,000 Kyoli speakers living in the two village clusters of Hal-Kyoli and Bobang. Bobang is the cultural center of the Kyoli-speaking area. Bobang village cluster consists of the five hamlets of Bobang, Fadek, Akoli, Hagong, and Nyamten. Hal-Kyoli village is situated by itself. All of the Kwoli villages surround the foot of Egu-Kyoli Hill, which rises more than 240 meters above the villages.

Tone
Cori is known for having six distinct levels of tone, too many to transcribe using the International Phonetic Alphabet, which allows five. However, there are only three underlying tones: 1, 4, and 6, which are all that need to be written for literacy. Most cases of Tone 2 are a result of tone sandhi, with 4 becoming 2 before 1.

In order to transcribe the surface tones without numerals (which are ambiguous), an extra diacritic is needed, as is common for four-level languages in Central America:  
1 
2 
3 
4 
5 
6 

Numerals
Kyoli numerals in different dialects:

References

Further reading
A Sociolinguistic Profile of the Kyoli (Cori) [cry] Language of Kaduna State, Nigeria
Dihoff, Ivan (1976). Aspects of the tonal structure of Chori. Doctoral dissertation, University of Wisconsin.

Languages of Nigeria
Central Plateau languages
Tonal languages